Matthew D. Sacchet is an American neuroscientist and Assistant Professor of Psychiatry at Harvard University. At Massachusetts General Hospital ("Mass General"), Sacchet directs the Meditation Research Program. His research focuses on advancing the science of meditation and includes studies of brain structure and function using multimodal neuroimaging, in addition to neurofeedback, clinical trials, and computational approaches (e.g., machine learning). He is notable for his work at the intersection of neuroscience, meditation, and mental illness. His work has been cited over 4,500 times and covered by major media outlets including CBS, NBC, NPR, Time, and The Wall Street Journal. In 2017 Forbes Magazine selected Sacchet for the “30 Under 30”.

Education 
Sacchet received a Sc.B. in Contemplative Science from Brown University and a Ph.D. in Neurosciences from Stanford University.

Academia

Career 
Sacchet has held research positions at Brown University, Harvard University, McLean Hospital, Massachusetts General Hospital, Massachusetts Institute of Technology, University of Tübingen, and Stanford University. Since 2019, he has been faculty at Harvard Medical School and since 2022 Massachusetts General Hospital where he directs the Meditation Research Program. The Meditation Research Program is affiliated with the Department of Psychiatry and the Athinoula A. Martinos Center for Biomedical Imaging. The Meditation Research Program uses scientific research approaches from affective and cognitive neuroscience, applied phenomenology, clinical psychology and psychiatry, computer science and related computational disciplines, contemplative and religious studies, neuroimaging and electrophysiology, psychometrics and psychological assessment, and psychosomatic medicine. The goal of the Meditation Research Program is to “contribute to improving individual well-being and the collective health of society by informing the development of meditation training and meditation-based interventions that are more effective, efficient, and targeted.”

Work 
Sacchet’s work has influenced several areas, including the science of meditation, brain connectivity in depression, machine learning and person-specific biomarkers for depression, and depression and the brain across the lifespan.

References

External links 

Mass General/Harvard Meditation Research Program
Google Scholar profile
Mass General/Harvard Athinoula A. Martinos Center for Biomedical Imaging Investigator profile
Harvard Brain Science Initiative Faculty profile
Harvard Mind Brain Behavior Interfaculty Initiative Faculty profile

American neuroscientists
Harvard University faculty
Year of birth missing (living people)
Living people
Brown University alumni
Stanford University alumni